The King Khan & BBQ Show LP is the first studio album by garage rock band The King Khan & BBQ Show. The album was recorded from 2002 to 2004 and released on September 29, 2004. It was re-issued twice: in 2005 by Hazelwood Records and in 2007 by In the Red Records.

Track listing

References

2004 albums
The King Khan & BBQ Show albums
Goner Records albums
In the Red Records albums